Subunit P of phosphatidylinositol N-acetylglucosaminyltransferase is an enzyme that in humans is encoded by the PIGP gene.

This gene encodes an enzyme involved in the first step of glycosylphosphatidylinositol (GPI)-anchor biosynthesis. The GPI anchor is a glycolipid found on many blood cells that serves to anchor proteins to the cell surface. The encoded protein is a component of the GPI-N-acetylglucosaminyltransferase complex that catalyzes the transfer of N-acetylglucosamine (GlcNAc) from UDP-GlcNAc to phosphatidylinositol (PI). This gene is located in the Down syndrome critical region on chromosome 21 and is a candidate for the pathogenesis of Down syndrome. Alternatively spliced transcript variants encoding different isoforms have been described.

References

Further reading